

Events and publications

January
 Specific date in January unknown: Dutch cartoonist Stefan Verwey wins the Inktspotprijs for Best Political Cartoon. He will win the award again next year.

February
 February 13: Comic artist Willy Vandersteen receives a statue in Antwerp, Belgium. 
 Superman Red/Superman Blue begins.
 Ghost Rider, vol. 3., 1990 series, cancelled by Marvel Comics with issue #93

March
 March 11: The Flemish newspapers Het Laatste Nieuws and De Nieuwe Gazet change the title of their weekly children comics supplement De Samson en Gert Krant, based on the popular TV show Samson en Gert, into De Plopkrant, based on the children's show Kabouter Plop.  
 Batman: Cataclysm begins.

May
 May 29: In the Danish magazine Anders And, the first episode of The Black Knight by Don Rosa is published, which marks the debut of Arpin Lusene.
 The first episode of Daniel Clowes' David Boring is prepublished in Eightball.
 Marvel Comics' Identity Crisis begins.
 Batman: Cataclysm concludes.

Spring
 Gay Comix (1980 series), with issue #25, publishes its final issue (Bob Ross)

June
 Emerald Knights begins.
 Identity Crisis concludes.
 Superman Red/Superman Blue concludes.

August
 August 24: The Dutch comics magazine Sjosji changes its name again into Sjosji Striparazzi.It will continue until 1999, after which it changes its name into Striparazzi.

September
 September 9: Through a long trial Albert Uderzo wins the profits and rights to all his Asterix-related merchandise and albums from previous publisher Dargaud.

October
 October 10-11: During the Stripdagen in Breda Joost Swarte receives the Stripschapprijs. Publisher Hansje Joustra wins the P. Hans Frankfurtherprijs. 
 Toy Biz buys Marvel Comics
 The "Emerald Knights" storyline concludes
 The Gathering of Five, taking place over Spider-Man's four main ongoing series
 Daredevil vol. 1, 1964 series, is canceled by Marvel with issue #380
 Excalibur is canceled by Marvel with issue #125
 The Sensational Spider-Man is canceled by Marvel with issue #33

November
 DC One Million takes place.
 The Final Chapter begins and concludes, taking place over Spider-Man's three main ongoing series
 The imprint Marvel Knights debuts with three new titles:
 Daredevil vol. 2 — the "Guardian Devil" storyline begins
 Black Panther vol. 3
 Inhumans vol. 2
 Peter Parker, the Spectacular Spider-Man is canceled by Marvel with issue #263.
 Silver Surfer vol. 2 is canceled by Marvel with issue #146.
 What If vol. 2 is canceled by Marvel with issue #114.
 November 18: The first page of Jerry Holkins and Mike Krahulik's Penny Arcade is uploaded to the Internet.

December
 December 8: In Topolino, Donald Duckling (Donald Duck as a child) makes his debut in a tale by Paola Mulazzi and Alessandro Barbucci.
The Hunt for Xavier begins.
 The Amazing Spider-Man and Peter Parker: Spider-Man are both restarted with new #1 issues.

Specific date unknown
Jim Lee announced that DC Comics would take over WildStorm Productions.
 MU Press publishes Those Annoying Post Bros. #63, the final issue of that title.

Births

Deaths

January
 January 5: Gustavo Martz Schmidt, Spanish comics artist (Toribio Doctor Cascarrabias, El Doctor Cataplasma, Troglodito, Camelio Majareto, El profesor Tragacanto,  Deliranta Rococó, La Pandilla Cu-Cux Plaf, El Sherrif Chiquito, continued Doña Urraca), dies at age 75. 
 January 7: Eli Bauer, American comics artist and animator (Kermit the Hermit, Norman), dies at age 69. 
 January 11: Win Mortimer, American comics artist (co-creator of Ripley's Believe It Or Not), dies at age 78.
 January 18: Adolfo Buylla, Spanish comics artist (Diego Valor, Yago Veloz), dies at age 70 or 71. 
 January 28: Shotaro Ishinomori, Japanese manga artist (Kamen Rider, Cyborg 009,  Sandarobotchi), dies at age 60 of heart failure.

February
 February 8: John Miles, British cartoonist and comics artist (Perkins), passes away at age 63. 
 February 14: Thomas McKimson, American comics artist and animator (Looney Tunes comics, Disney comics, worked on the Roy Rogers comic strip), dies at age 90. 
 February 16: Gervy, French comics artist (Pat'Apouf), passes away at age 89. 
 February 28: Antonio Prohías, Cuban-American comics artist (Spy vs. Spy), dies at age 77.

March
 March 1: Archie Goodwin, American comics writer (Luke Cage, Manhunter, Secret Agent X-9, Captain Kate, worked for Blazing Combat, Creepy and Eerie) and artist (assisted on Mary Perkins on Stage), dies at age 60.
 March 3: Olaf Stoop, Dutch activist and underground comics artist (Roza's Lotgevallen), dies at the age of 52 from a heart attack. 
 March 23: John Sikela, Slovakian-American comics artist (worked on Superman, Superboy), dies at age 90 or 91.

April
 April 7: Alex Schomburg, Puerto Rican-American comics artist (Timely Comics), dies at age 92.
 April 8: Lee Elias, British-American comics artist (Beyond Mars, Black Cat), dies at age 77.
 April 17: E.E. Hibbard, American painter and comics artist (worked on The Flash, Green Lantern and was the first artist to illustrate a Justice Society story), dies at age 89. 
 April 23: Enrique Riverón, Cuban-American cartoonist, animator and comics artist, dies at age 95 or 96. 
 April 26: Bill Crooks, American comics artist (assisted on Captain Easy), dies at age 80.

June
 June 13: Reg Smythe, British comics artist (Andy Capp), dies at age 80.

July
 July 16: Tony Sgroi, American animator and comics artist (Disney comics), dies at age 73.

August
 August 1: 
 René Bonnet, French comics artist (Fripounet et Marisette), dies at age 92. 
 Florenci Clavé, Spanish comics artist (Rémy Herphelin), dies at age 62. 
 August 15: Wim Hessels, aka Woeloem, Dutch comics artist (Stoffertje Zuig, Manusje van Alles, Boerensloot, Spatje, Muisje Nisje), dies at age 70. 
 August 20: Robert Rigot, French illustrator, caricaturist and comics artist (Chantal, Frédéri le Gardian, Les Rapaces), dies at age 89.

September
 September 1: Francisco Coching, Filipino comics artist (Marabini, Hagibis, Sabas, ang Barbaro Pedro Penduko, El Indio), dies at age 86.
 September 3: Vincent Alascia, American comics artist (American Avenger, worked on Captain America), dies at age 84.

October
 October 28: Les Carroll, American comics artist (The Tillers, Life with the Rimples, assisted Boots and Her Buddies and Alley Oop, continued Our Boarding House), dies at age 86.

November
 November 2: Enric Sió, Spanish comics artist (La Guerra de los Poetas, Mara, Mis Miedos), dies from a stroke at age 56.
 November 3: Bob Kane, American comics artist (Batman), dies at age 83.
 November 17: Bill Ward, American comics artist (Torchy), dies at age 79.
 November 24: Jacques Eggermont, Belgian comics artist and animator (Bicky, Kaatje en Klopje), passes away at age 80.

December
 December 10: Ray Goossens, Belgian comics artist (Reynaert de Vos, Ouwe Taaie, Mr. Snor, Tijl Uilenspiegel (sometimes titled Tijl en Lamme), Pimmeke, Snops, Tsjoem) and animator (Musti), dies at age 74.
 December 13: Jean Vern, French musician and comics artist (collaborated with scriptwriter Pierre Christin and comics artist Jacques Lob), dies at age 58. 
 December 21: André LeBlanc, Haitian-American-Brazilian comics artist (Intellectual Amos, Morena Flor, Our Bible in Pictures, assisted on The Spirit, Flash Gordon, The Phantom), dies at age 77. 
 December 23: Joe Orlando, American comics artist (co-creator of the Weird Science, Weird Fantasy series), dies at age 71.
 December 29: Jean-Claude Forest, French comics artist (Barbarella), dies at age 68.
 December 31: Sándor Gugi, Hungarian comics artist (Talál Tamás, Der Arme Leopold, adaptations of literary novels), dies at age 81. 
 Specific date unknown: Reginald Ben Davies, British illustrator and comics artist (Jill Crusoe in the Land of the White Queen, Katy of Cedar Creek), passes away at age 90 or 91.

Specific date unknown
 Kim Young-hwan, aka Gita Koji, Korean comics artist (Kojubu Samgukji), passes away at age 85 or 86.

Conventions 
 January 22–25: Angoulême International Comics Festival (Angoulême, France)
 February 21–22: Alternative Press Expo (San Jose, California)
 March 13–15: MegaCon (Orlando Expo Center, Orlando, Florida, USA) — guests include Stephen Furst and Robin Downs of Babylon 5
 March 21–22: United Kingdom Comic Art Convention (Manchester, England) — guests include  Joe Sacco, Alex Ross, Eddie Campbell, Colleen Doran, Woodrow Phoenix, William Messner-Loebs, Alan Grant, and Dave Taylor ; presentation of the National Comics Awards; final iteration of the UKCAC
 April 17–19: WonderCon (Oakland, California)
 April 25–26: Pittsburgh Comicon (Pittsburgh ExpoMart, Monroeville, Pennsylvania) — guests include Kevin Smith and Jim Mahfood
 May 15–17: Motor City Comic Con I (Novi Expo Center, Novi, Michigan)
 May 16: Ramapo Comic Con XII (Ramapo High School, Spring Valley, New York) — guests include Barry Blair, Howard Cruse, Evan Dorkin, Sarah Dyer, Dave Cockrum, Joe Quesada, Jimmy Palmiotti, Fred Hembeck,  and Amanda Conner
 Summer: "The Death of CAPTION" (Oxford Union Society, Oxford, England)
 June 3–5: Heroes Convention (Charlotte Convention Center, Charlotte, North Carolina) — guests include "Trilogy Tour" II members Jeff Smith, Charles Vess, Linda Medley, Mark Crilley, Jill Thompson, and Stan Sakai
 June 26–28: Fan Expo Canada (Metro Toronto Convention Centre, Toronto, Ontario, Canada) — 6,778 attendees; guests include Joe Quesada, Greg Capullo, Joseph Michael Linsner, Jimmy Palmiotti, Humberto Ramos, Christina Z, Amanda Conner, Chester Brown, Joe Matt, and Seth
 July 17–19: Wizard World Chicago (Rosemont Convention Center, Rosemont, Illinois) — 25,000 attendees; guest of honor: Todd McFarlane; special guests: David Prowse and Kenny Baker; other guests include "Trilogy Tour" II members Jeff Smith, Charles Vess, Linda Medley, Mark Crilley, Jill Thompson, and Stan Sakai
 July 17–18: Zinefest (Los Angeles and Orange, California)
 Aug. 11–12: Pro/Con (San Diego, California) — 6th Pro/Con moves from Oakland to San Diego; held right before Comic-Con International
 August 13–17: Comic-Con International (San Diego Convention Center, San Diego, California) — 42,000 attendees. Special guests include John Broome, Eddie Campbell, Nick Cardy, Mark Crilley, Colleen Doran, Lorenzo Mattotti, Terry Moore, Paul S. Newman, James Robinson, Joe Simon, Paul Smith, Vin Sullivan, Naoko Takeuchi, Chris Ware, and Robert Williams
 September 3–6: Dragon Con (Hyatt Regency Atlanta/ AmericasMart, Atlanta, Georgia) — 18,000 attendees
 September 11–12: Big Apple Comic Con I (Church of St. Paul the Apostle, New York City)
 September 26–27: Small Press Expo (Holiday Inn Select, Bethesda, Maryland)
 October 9–10: Festival of Cartoon Art (Ohio State University, Columbus, Ohio) — 6th edition
 October 10: Big Apple Comic Con II (Church of St. Paul the Apostle, New York City)
 October 10–11: Motor City Comic Con II (Dearborn Civic Center, Dearborn, Michigan)
 October 17–18: SuperCon III (Oakland Convention Center, Oakland, California)
 November 13–15: The Graphic Novel: a 20th Anniversary Conference on an Emerging Literary and Artistic Medium (the University of Massachusetts Amherst, Amherst, Massachusetts) — program book features a brief essay by Will Eisner, "Twentieth Anniversary Reflections on A Contract with God"
 November 13–14: Big Apple Comic Con III (Church of St. Paul the Apostle, New York City)
 November 28–29: Mid-Ohio Con (Adam's Mark Hotel, Columbus, Ohio) — guests include "Trilogy Tour" II members Jeff Smith, Charles Vess, Linda Medley, Mark Crilley, Jill Thompson, and Stan Sakai

First issues by title
 Elseworld's Finest: Supergirl & Batgirl

References